Ruwa is a town in Harare Metropolitan Province, Zimbabwe, situated 22 km south-east of the capital Harare on the main Harare-Mutare highway and railway line.

Overview
It serves as a small administrative and trading centre for the surrounding mixed farming area.  In recent years it has grown rapidly and has become a popular area for people moving out of Harare.

The Ruwa Rehabilitation Centre just outside the town was established in 1981 for the rehabilitation of disabled ex-combatants.

The Ruwa Scout Park which hosted the Central African Jamboree in 1959 is located nearby.

Ruwa falls within the Seke constituency and in the 2005 parliamentary election elected Phineas Chihota with a majority of over 6000 votes.

UFO sighting 

In 1994, the Ariel School  in Ruwa was reported to be the site of a sighting of a landed UFO. Some of the approximately 60 students involved in the sighting also reported that a "strange being" communicated with them. According to the students, interviewed in groups by John E. Mack, they were warned to take care of the environment.

Sources

Populated places in Mashonaland East Province